Fron may refer to:

Places

Norway
 Fron, Norway, a former municipality in Innlandet county
 Nord-Fron, a municipality in Innlandet county
 Sør-Fron, a municipality in Innlandet county

Wales
 Fron, a colloquial name for the village of Froncysyllte in Wrexham county borough
 Fron, Powys, a small village in Llanbadarn Fawr in Powys county
 Y Fron, a country village on the south-west side of Moel Tryfan in North Wales

Iceland
 Frón is a synonym for the name Iceland in Icelandic (Ísland).

See also 
 Frons (disambiguation)